Football Conference or Football conference may refer to:

In the United Kingdom
National League (English football), formerly Football Conference – an association football league in England

In the United States
The American Football Conference (AFC) or the National Football Conference (NFC) – The two conferences of the professional National Football League (NFL)
Any of the many college athletic conferences that compete in American football sponsored by the NCAA (Division I, Division II, or Division III), NAIA, or other governing bodies
Any of the now defunct college athletic conferences that once competed in American football in the NCAA or other governing bodies
All-America Football Conference – a now defunct professional American football league in operation from 1946 to 1949